Guido Elbogen (1845–1918) was an Austrian banker and mathematician who became President of the Anglo-Austrian Bank.

Early life
He was born into a Jewish family on 27 December 1845 in Jungbunzlau (now Mladá Boleslav) in Bohemia. Of the children of Rabbi Isak Elbogen (1812–1883) and his wife Friederike (née Pokorny; 1825–1906) he was the only one to survive beyond infancy.

Career
After studying at the Academy of Commerce in Prague, Elbogen entered the banking business at the Ladenburg Bank in London, before moving to Paris where he joined Oppenheim, Alberti and Co, working to Antoine Schwabacher whose daughter Rosalie he married in 1868. In 1874 a lampooning cartoon of him appeared on the front cover of an issue of the French satirical newspaper Comic-Finance, which also included a biographical piece by the newspaper's editor Ernest Schrameck, writing under the pen name "Sergines". Elbogen made at least 15 business trips to Spain, representing the interests of French banks, including the Bank of Paris, successfully negotiating with the Spanish authorities for the repayment of outstanding bank loans.

In 1877 Elbogen and his family moved from Paris to Vienna, where he took up the post of President of the Anglo-Austrian Bank.

In 1865, Elbogen submitted a proposal for a lottery savings bank, an idea that was taken up in Italy in 1880 and debated in the Italian Parliament, but was not approved.

Publications
 Lotto oder Sparcassen (1880), H Engel.
 (with Alie Elbogen) Der Großeltern Vermächtnis (1904), Engel und Sohn.

Personal life

In 1868, in Paris, he married Rosalie (Alie) (née Schwabacher; 1850, Paris 1940, Sartrouville, Île-de-France), daughter of banker Antoine Schwabacher and his wife Helene, née Hendle. 

Elbogen and his family moved to Vienna when he joined the Anglo-Austrian Bank; he also bought a country estate, Schloss Thalheim, in Lower Austria. 

They had three daughters and a son:  
 Antoinette (1871–1901), who married Wilhelm von Adler; they and their family settled in Paris, taking the surname d'Adler  
 Heinrich (also known as Henri, 1872–1927), who took up sports shooting and represented Austria at the 1912 Summer Olympics
  Helene (1878–1882), who died in infancy
 Jenny (1882–1957) who married Friedrich Weleminsky; they had four children together. She inherited Schloss Thalheim from her father and was a poet, translator and Esperantist.

Death and legacy
Elbogen died on 10 December 1918 at Schloss Thalheim, aged 72. He is buried at Vienna Central Cemetery.

Notes

References

1845 births
1918 deaths
19th-century Austrian Jews
20th-century Austrian Jews
Austrian bankers
Burials at the Vienna Central Cemetery
Elbogen family
Jewish bankers
People from Mladá Boleslav